Hypomyces camphorati is a parasitic ascomycete in the family Hypocreaceae. Its host species is Lactarius camphoratus, and it causes a whitish to yellowish subiculum to form on the hymenium of the host, covering and preventing formation of the gills. It also causes deformed cap shape and densifying flesh.

Hypomyces camphorati is often treated as Hypomyces lateritius, but it is set apart by its yellowish coloration and slightly larger ascospores. Further research is required to determine whether H. camphorati is indeed a separate species.

References

Hypocreaceae
Taxa named by Charles Horton Peck
Fungi described in 1906
Fungi of North America
Parasitic fungi